The women's individual normal hill ski jumping event at the FIS Nordic World Ski Championships 2011 was held on 25 February 2011 at 15:00 CET. Lindsey Van of the United States was the defending world champion.

Results

References

FIS Nordic World Ski Championships 2011
2011 in Norwegian women's sport